David Mead may refer to:
David Mead (military general), founder of Meadville, Pennsylvania
David Mead (musician), American pop singer and songwriter
David Mead (rugby league), Papua New Guinean rugby league footballer